When playing music remotely, musicians must reduce or eliminate the issue of audio latency in order to play in time together. While standard web conferencing software is designed to facilitate remote audio and video communication, it has too much latency for live musical performance. Connection-oriented Internet protocols subject audio signals to delays and other interference which presents a problem for keeping latency low enough for musicians to play together remotely.

Software created specifically to minimise or eliminate some of the issues with Internet-related audio latency enables musicians to perform live music together over domestic broadband connections. The use of various compression and other techniques, together with affordable low-latency audio interface hardware (which most of the systems listed here are also optimised to work with), has reached a state in which it is practical for even large numbers of musicians to play or sing together without experiencing significant problems.

The following table compares key features of software written for the expressed purpose of allowing musicians to perform music together over the Internet.  It does not attempt to cover subjective features such as sound quality or ease of use. However, some software on the list may address different aspects of remote collaboration better than others, or may be more suited to certain musical genres.

Table Heading Notes 
 [a] - Whether the system supports public or private performance or playing.
 [b] - Whether the system has a built-in mechanism for helping or enforcing the musicians to play together. For an explanation of "delayed sync" method see https://jammr.net/howitworks.html (or, more in depth, https://forum.cockos.com/showthread.php?p=2230659#post2230659)

See also 
 Networked music performance

References 

Music software
Music-related lists